The Movie Channel was a British television service which only aired movies. Launched on British Satellite Broadcasting, The Movie Channel was a predecessor of some of the Sky Movies channels, having survived the 1990 merger with Sky Television, another satellite service launched by Rupert Murdoch's News International.

History
The Movie Channel began on 25 March 1990 was one of the services of British Satellite Broadcasting, a consortium formed on 11 December 1986 as the name given to the network during the bidding process was Screen by Granada Television, Pearson, Virgin, Anglia Television and Amstrad. Prior to its launch, BSB signed an exclusive first-run deal with United International Pictures (which distributed Paramount, Universal and MGM/UA releases). One of its first premieres was the 1987 James Bond film, The Living Daylights.

Both BSB and Sky Television suffered heavy losses and merged, operating as the newly formed British Sky Broadcasting. The Movie Channel, along with The Sports Channel remained on air, and it launched on the Astra 1B satellite on 15 April 1991. It continued to broadcast as The Movie Channel until 31 October 1997 when it was rebranded as Sky Movies Screen 2.

See also
 Starview
 Premiere
 Home Video Channel
 Carlton Cinema
 Film4

References

External links
 The Movie Channel at TVARK (BSB)
 The Movie Channel at TVARK (Sky)

Defunct television channels in the United Kingdom
Sky television channels
Movie channels in the United Kingdom
Television channels and stations established in 1990
Television channels and stations disestablished in 1997
1990s in the United Kingdom
1990s in British television
History of television in the United Kingdom